Kim Jong-suk (24 December 1917  – 22 September 1949) was a Korean anti-Japanese guerrilla, a Communist activist, North Korean leader Kim Il-sung's first wife, former leader Kim Jong-il's mother, and current leader Kim Jong-un's grandmother.

Biography
Kim Jong-suk was born on Christmas Eve 1917 in Hoeryong County, North Hamgyong Province, Japanese Korea. Suh Dae-sook writes that she was "the elder of two daughters of a poor farmer." However, the Korean Central News Agency (KCNA), states that she had a younger brother, Kim Ki-song (김기송), who was born 9 February 1921.

Kim Jong-suk followed her mother to Manchuria to look for her father, but they discovered that he had already died there. Soon after that, her mother died and she became an orphan. Most sources agree that Kim Jong-suk then joined Kim Il-sung’s guerrilla force in 1935 or 1936 as a kitchen helper.  The KCNA, however, reports that Kim Jong-suk and Kim Ki-song joined the guerrilla forces after their mother and their elder brother’s wife were murdered by the Japanese.

During this time, Kim Jong-suk worked various odd jobs, and was arrested by the Japanese in 1937 in an undercover attempt to secure food and supplies. After her release, she rejoined the guerrillas, where she cooked, sewed, and washed.

It was around this time that Kim Jong-suk reportedly saved Kim Il-sung’s life. Baik Bong relates the story in Kim Il-sung's official biography:

Kim Jong-suk married Kim Il Sung in the Soviet Union, most likely in 1941. On 16 February 1941 (or 1942, sources vary), in the Soviet village of Vyatskoye, Kim Jong-suk had Kim Jong-il, who was given the Russian name "Yuri Irsenovich Kim," and the nickname "Yura." In 1944, Kim Jong-suk had Kim Man-il, in Korean and "Alexander" or "Shura" in Russian. In 1946, she gave birth to a daughter, Kim Kyŏng-hŭi. Augustina Vardugina, a woman from Vyatskoye, was in her teens when Kim Il-sung's guerrilla group camped there. She remembers Kim Jong-suk, and how she would come to the village to barter military rations for chicken and eggs. Her son, Kim Jong-il, would be holding her hand.

A year after the establishment of the Democratic People's Republic of Korea (DPRK) and until her death, Kim Jong-suk was the first lady of North Korea. According to some accounts, Kim Jong-suk "was a small, quiet woman, not particularly well educated, but friendly and life-loving." Major General N.G. Lebedev, an executive Soviet officer during the Soviet occupation of North Korea, recalled Kim Jong-suk as "a vivacious and generous lady who always cooked enormous amounts of food for the hungry Soviet generals when they visited Kim’s home."

Death

In commentary on one edition of Kim Il Sung's official autobiography, With the Century,  it is stated that she died of an ectopic pregnancy on September 22, 1949. 
According to Harrold, she died from "the hardships she had endured during the years as a guerrilla fighter."

Legacy
After Kim Jong-il succeeded Kim Il Sung, he began to make his mother, Kim Jong-suk, into "a revolutionary immortal." This campaign created "a holy trinity known as the ‘Three Generals.’" Instead of touting Kim Jong-suk as the quiet woman that she was, she became the heroine of the revolution. The website of the National Democratic Front of South Korea (NDFSK) says she was "a peerless heroine . . . an anti-Japanese heroine . . . a faithful retainer who faithfully carried out General Kim Il Sung’s [Kim Il-sung] will but also a lifeguard who safeguarded the General of every dangerous movement."

Kim Jong-suk was recorded to have "conducted on-the-spot guidance sessions" and was a "great strategist". In her home town of Hoeryong, "a museum, a library, a statue, a square and the house in which she was born" are "devoted to the 'Mother of Korea'". She arranged parachute training and won several shooting competitions. One story says that she would wash Kim Il-sung's socks and dry them in her bosom, or cut her hair and spread it in Kim Il-sung's shoes.

Michael Harrold, in his memoir Comrades and Strangers, relates several stories he heard about Kim Jong-suk while in North Korea. According to him, there is a memorial near Mount Kumgang that marks where Kim Jong-suk stopped "when she realized she had forgotten to bring the great leader’s lunch, and had turned back to prepare something to eat for when he returned from the mountains." Kim Jong-suk is also credited with inspiring Kim Jong-il to build the Ryugyong Hotel. Harrold relates that Kim Jong-suk told a young Kim Jong-il that he "must build tall buildings for the people, of 30 or even 40 stories," and the son replied that he would build housing 100 stories high. This led to the construction of the 105-story Ryugyong Hotel, which is still not opened.

On 1 June 2015, the Daily NK reported that Kim Jong-suk's wedding ring had gone missing from Pyongyang's Korean Revolution Museum sometime in late May. Items belonging to key figures of the Kim family are of great importance. In 2010, state television aired a show dedicated to the story behind the ring, which was, purportedly, given to her by Kim Il-sung in 1938 for her role in the anti-Japanese guerrilla movement.

Many places in North Korea are named after her, including Kimjongsuk County, Kim Jong-suk Naval Academy, Kim Jong-suk Teacher Training College, Kim Jong-suk Rest Home, and Kim Jong-suk Pyongyang Silk Mill.

In North Korean News

In North Korean News The KCNA regularly reports on Kim Jong-suk, either honoring her memory or describing her revolutionary activities. The following are headlines from articles relating to Kim Jong-suk from 2012:

National Meeting on International Women's Day Held: "Kim Jong Suk, an anti-Japanese war hero, upheld the original idea and policy of Kim Il Sung and performed distinguished feats in the development of the movement for women's emancipation in Korea." (8 March 2012)
Wax Replica of Kim Jong Suk Displayed: "A hall housing a wax replica of the anti-Japanese war hero, Kim Jong Suk, was opened at the International Friendship Exhibition House in the Democratic People's Republic of Korea on Tuesday." (26 April 2012)
Wax sculpture dedicated to great woman: "She carried out secret political tasks assigned by Kim Il Sung" and "She brought up Kim Jong Il as the Shining Star of Mt. Paektu to maintain the lifeline of the Korean revolution." Government officials Kim Ki Nam, Secretary of WPK Choe Thea Bok, Yang Hyong Sop, and KPA General Pak Jae Gyong made statements at the dedication. Zhang Molei, Director of the Great Man Wax Museum of China also made a speech. (5 May 2012)
Moran Hill Associated with Patriotic Will of Peerlessly Great Persons: "On March 2, 1946 President Kim Il Sung, leader Kim Jong Il and woman commander of Mt. Paektu Kim Jong Suk mounted the hill together." (17 June 2012)
Collection of Music Anecdotes "Mother and Song" Published: "The collection contains four parts of 95 anecdotes about anti-Japanese war hero Kim Jong Suk who struggled, regarding songs as a mighty treasured sword along with arms of the revolution and an appendix of music of relevant songs." (18 July 2012)
Pujon Revolutionary Battle Site of DPRK Introduced by ITAR-TASS: The events of the Pujon Revolutionary Battle Site, "where Kim Jong Suk, a model of devotedly defending the leader, waged revolutionary activities." (7 August 2012)
Kim Jong Suk's Life Lauded by Foreign Organizations: "A Brazilian organization and a regional body posted special write-ups on their Internet websites on the occasion of the 63rd anniversary of the passing of Kim Jong Suk, anti-Japanese war hero." (2 October 2012)

Awards
 Hero of the Republic, 21 September 1972 (posthumous)
 Order of the National Flag (1st Class with Neck Chain)

See also
Kim Tu-bong
Kim Jong-il

Notes and references

Notes

References

Works cited

Further reading

External links

로동신문 - 김정숙,전세계녀성들의 귀감 
13. 항일의 녀성영웅 김정숙녀사께서 

1917 births
1949 deaths
People from Hoeryong
Korean independence activists
Spouses of North Korean national leaders
Women in war in East Asia
Korean revolutionaries
Kim dynasty (North Korea)
Korean communists
Korean expatriates in the Soviet Union
Women in war 1900–1945
20th-century North Korean women politicians
20th-century North Korean politicians
National Heroes of North Korea
Deaths in childbirth
People of 88th Separate Rifle Brigade